"New Paths to Helicon, Pt. 2" (almost always referred to as "Helicon 2") is a song by Scottish band Mogwai. It was first released as a double A-side with "New Paths to Helicon, Pt. 1", on 7" limited to 3000 copies. It was later included on the 1997 compilation album, Ten Rapid (Collected Recordings 1996-1997). The single reached #2 in English radio presenter John Peel's 1997 Festive Fifty Chart.

Overview
A live version of "Helicon 2" (recorded live by John Peel from a BBC Radio Session at Maida Vale on 20 January 1998) can be found on Mogwai's 2005 live compilation album, Government Commissions: BBC Sessions 1996-2003. The last track on Ten Rapid, "End", is simply "Helicon 2" played backwards. "Helicon 2" was featured on the Scottish Association for Mental Health's 2004 compilation album, One-In-Four.

Musical composition
The track begins immediately with a quiet guitar melody, and soft drums which are repeated along with bass and guitar doubling them. At (0:34), the guitar goes on to play a lead part, while the other guitar plays soft harmonics. At (1:08), they slide back into the main riff. At (1:42), a stronger, more distinctive lead part is played. This continues until (2:16), when the main riff is repeated for the last time. At (2:32), the song ends abruptly.

Personnel
 Stuart Braithwaite – guitar
 Dominic Aitchison – bass guitar
 John Cummings – guitar
 Martin Bulloch – drums
 Andy Miller – producer, mixer

Notes

External links
Guitar Tablature for "Helicon 2"
Last.fm page for "Helicon 2"

Mogwai songs
1997 singles
Rock instrumentals